Brigada Mass Media Corporation (BMMC) is a newspaper company and media network in the Philippines. It is the first-ever local Tri-media organization to have emerged from the Soccsksargen area as a national network with its array of Brigada News FM stations. BMMC is part of Brigada Group of Companies of entrepreneur Elmer Catulpos which also maintains three newspaper editions in Mindanao, one TV station, distribution of herbal food supplements, medicines, cosmetics and engine care products, a drug pharmacy, a garden resort and two private security agencies.

Its main Brigada Complex is located at NLSA Road, San Isidro, General Santos, Philippines while its National Broadcast Center is located at the 5th floor, Jacinta Building II, EDSA, Guadalupe Nuevo, Makati.

History
It all started with the publication of Brigada News Philippines, first named as Brigada Tolendoy News and Tips, an internet café-based, one-color, 6-page and comic-sized tabloid on October 18, 2005, with a circulation in General Santos. The tabloid had generated approximately 1,000 printed copies of its maiden issue.

It was founded by then Bombo Radyo General Santos regular anchor; independent news publisher; and now Brigada News Philippines President and Chief-Executive Officer Elmer Catulpos.

Its main office is in General Santos, but the company also has offices in Davao and Cagayan de Oro, with its own edition each. It has a combined daily circulation of 21,000 copies sold, practically covering the entire Mindanao region.

In April 2007, 2 years after the birth of Brigada News Philippines, Brigada Healthline Marketing was established as distributor of health products that the company advertised in its daily newspaper and block time radio programs.

In October 2009, it expanded its media operations to radio by acquiring 89.5 from Baycomms Broadcasting Corporation and reformatting it to 89.5 Brigada News FM, the first-ever radio station in General Santos with an AM & FM format. After a short period of time from its inception, it already became the Over-All #2 radio station, both AM and FM stations combined in General Santos and neighboring areas, according to the then latest AC Nielsen Survey. Subsequently, in early 2013, it obtained the Over-all #3 spot, according to the KBP-RRC Survey.

In January 2012, it expanded its operations once more to television with Brigada News TV 46, Eye of Mindanao, acquired from Asian Multimedia and Productions, which is the first-ever local television station which devotes 70-80% of its programs to local issues and concerns. Given its still very short stint in the television industry, it has already eaten up a big slice of the pie of viewership especially its news and public affairs programs in the prime time slots in the morning and afternoon. Since December 2015, Brigada News TV moved to UHF channel 34.

Since February 2013, Brigada News FM expanded to 25 cities and municipalities in the Philippines through its subsequent acquisition and 100% takeover of Baycomms Broadcasting Corporation, its owned and operated stations and other smaller radio networks.

In April 2014, Brigada News FM National Offices in Makati was inaugurated and relocated Brigada News FM Batangas to become Brigada News FM National and completing the three broadcast centers of the network, Manila, Cebu and General Santos.

As of 2017, BMMC now has 40 owned and operated stations in the country, larger than its main all-news competitor Radyo5 News FM but is ahead of another news/talk radio competitor Radyo Bandera.

In 2022, the frequency of the former DZMM was assigned by the NTC to Baycomms under Provisional Authority.

Brigada News Philippines (newspaper)
Brigada News Nationwide
Brigada News General Santos
Brigada News Davao
Brigada News Cagayan de Oro
Brigada News Zamboanga
Brigada News Cebu

Brigada News FM

Overview
Brigada News FM stations are collectively known as Brigada News FM Philippines with its  current slogan Tama Noh!? (Filipino bastardization of Is that right?). Currently, Brigada News FM has more than 50 owned and operated FM stations across the country, the most number of stations for a news-formatted radio network compared to their other networks in AM radio and more are planned to be opened.

Since October 18, 2017, Brigada News FM operates five network feeds (Manila, Pampanga, Batangas, Cebu and General Santos) for its stations to simulcast various programming. National news and select musical shows have been provided from Manila on a regular basis since its opening in 2014, while the Batangas feed was carved out in October 2017 to provide provincial and Southern Luzon-exclusive content. The Pampanga feed was launched in August 2017. Cebu City formerly provided national content of music until mid-2016 when that purpose was relegated to the Visayas area. However, the Visayas feed can still be simulcast nationally when deemed necessary. General Santos's feed consists of health-oriented shows cleared for all stations during primetime and breaking news from Mindanao when warranted.

Stations

Majority of BMMC's stations are acquired from Baycomms (prior to the merger in 2013), hence becoming Brigada's official broadcast licensee, except the following stations that are either acquired or operated under airtime lease agreements:
DYWF Cebu: Owned by Vimcontu Broadcasting Corporation.
DXKX Davao: Owned by Primax Broadcasting Network.
DWKM Naga and DWED Legazpi: Owned by Century Broadcasting Network.
DWLH Sorsogon: Acquired from Hypersonic Broadcasting Center.
DYMG Bacolod: Acquired from Armed Forces of the Philippines.
DWCL Pampanga: Owned by UBC Media Ministries.
Brigada News FM Zamboanga first utilized 93.1 FM under airtime lease from Audiovisual Communicators Inc. in 2013 before moving to Baycomms-owned 89.9 FM in 2015.

Brigada TV
 Analog Free TV

 Digital Free TV

Cable TV

Products
Unlike other media entities, Brigada Mass Media does not rely on any third-party advertisements from major companies. Brigada News FM and TV stations acts as a sales and marketing arm of these Healthline products under the Brigada Healthline Corporation. Brigada Healthline products are also aired as an early morning blocktimer on 91.5 Win Radio Manila as of 2017.

Power Cells Herbal Capsule
Drivemax Herbal Dietary Supplement Capsule 
Guard-C 500 mg Capsule (Ascorbic Acid as Calcium Ascorbate)
Power Cells Liniment
NutriCleanse Herbal Capsule
Power Cells Soya Coffee
Fast Relax Ibuprofen-Paracetamol Capsule
Panamed Mefenamic Acid Capsule
CuraMed Herbal Dietary Supplement Capsule
Maxan Mangosteen-Xantone Capsule
Maxan 8 in 1 Coffee
DriveMax Adult Coffee
Hard Bull Dietary Supplement Capsule for Men
YummyVit Syrup and Capsule
Bossing Premium Detergent
Bridgette Cosmetics
Lala Cosmetics
AeroLube Engine Treatment Oil
Nigari

References

External links
Brigada Website

National newspapers published in the Philippines
Mass media companies of the Philippines
Companies based in General Santos
Mass media in General Santos
Philippine companies established in 2005
Mass media companies established in 2005